Pinakkatt D. Abraham, better known as Swargachitra Appachan is an Indian film producer, distributor, and entrepreneur. He is the founder of production and distribution company Swargachitra, best known for producing Godfather, Manichithrathazhu,

Career
Among the films produced by him, Manichitrathazhu is considered as one of the best thrillers ever made in India as well as one of the best Malayalam films ever made. Manichitrathazhu was remade after nearly 10 years in various languages, including Kannada (Apthamitra), Tamil and Telugu (dubbed) (Chandramukhi), Bengali (Rajmohol), and Hindi (Bhool Bhulaiyaa), all being commercially successful. Apart from being the highest grossing Malayalam film ever, Manichitrathazhu was selected as second greatest Indian film through an IBNLive poll.

Filmography
Production

Distribution
In Harihar Nagar
Pappayude Swantham Appoos
Godfather
Vietnam Colony
Manichitrathazhu
Manathe Vellitheru
Kabooliwala
No. 1 Snehatheeram Bangalore North
Chandralekha
Aniathipravu
Aaram Thampuran
Ayal Kadha Ezhuthukayanu
Ustaad
Narasimham
Raavanaprabhu
Praja
Kakkakuyil
Runway
Manjupoloru Penkutti
Sethurama Iyer CBI
Vellinakshatram
Nerariyan CBI
CBI 5 (2022 film)

See also
 Navodaya Appachan

References

External links
 

Malayalam film producers
Living people
Kannada film producers
Tamil film producers
Year of birth missing (living people)